Cercyon nevadanus is a species of water scavenger beetle in the family Hydrophilidae. It is found in North America.

References

Further reading

 
 
 
 

Hydrophilidae
Beetles described in 1924